Omid Tabibzadeh Ghamsari (born 1961 in Tehran) is an Iranian linguist and Professor of Linguistics at the Institute for Humanities and Cultural Studies.
He is a winner of Farabi International Award and is known for his research on Persian phonology, Persian grammar, Dependency grammar and Persian metres. Tabibzadeh received his BA in English from Shahid Bahonar University and his MA  and PhD in linguistics from University of Tehran.
Tabibzadeh previously taught at the Bu-Ali Sina University. He is the editor-in-chief of the journal Language and Linguistics.

Books
 Metrics of the Persian Folk Poetry, Omid Tabibzadeh, Tehran: Niloufar, 2003
 Persian Grammar, Omid Tabibzadeh, Tehran: Markaz, 2012
 Verb Valency and Basic Sentence Structures in Modern Persian (A Dependency-Based Approach), Omid Tabibzadeh, Tehran: Markaz, 2006

References

External links
 Tabibzadeh at Bu-Ali Sina University's Website
 

1961 births
Living people
Linguists from Iran
University of Tehran alumni
Academic staff of Bu-Ali Sina University
Iranian phonologists
Phoneticians
Farabi International Award recipients
Shahid Bahonar University of Kerman alumni
Grammarians of Persian
Syntacticians
Academic staff of the Institute for Humanities and Cultural Studies
Faculty of Letters and Humanities of the University of Tehran alumni
Corpus linguists
Iranian translators
English–Persian translators
Linguistics journal editors